Tacheng, as the official romanized name, also transliterated from Mongolian as Qoqak, is a county-level city (1994 est. pop. 56,400) and the administrative seat of Tacheng Prefecture, in northern Ili Kazakh Autonomous Prefecture, Xinjiang.

The city was sometimes called Tarbaghatay or Tarbagatai (Mongolian: 'having marmots') and in European languages as Chuguchak (based on its name in the Mongolian language).
The current official Chinese name Tacheng is an abbreviation of "Tarbaghatay City". The current Uyghur name is Qöqäk transliterated from Mongolian.

For a long time it has been a major center for trade with Central Asia because it is an agricultural hub. Its industries include food processing, textiles, and utilities.

History
In the mid-19th century, Chuguchak was considered the most important commercial center of Western China after Ghulja (Yining), being an important center of trade between China and Russia, in particular in tea. The city, surrounded by an earth wall, was the residence of two Qing ambans and had a garrison of some 1,000 Chinese soldiers and 1,500 Manchu and Mongol soldiers.

Chuguchak suffered harshly in 1865 during the fighting between the Qing forces and the Dungan and Hui rebels.

Border crossing
In April 1962, during the Ili-Tacheng Incident , over 60,000 Chinese nationals, including around 48,000 Tacheng residents, illegally crossed the Xinjiang–Kazakh SSR border, leading to massive economic loss in Tacheng; the border crossing closed in August of that year. The crossing re-opened on 20 October 1990, and was deemed a "first-class port of entry" on 14 March 1994. On 1 July 1995, the crossing opened to use by third nations.

Administrative divisions 
Subdistricts
Heping Subdistrict, Dubieke Subdistrict, Xincheng Subdistrict
	
Town
Ergong

Townships
Karakabak, Chasha Township, Abudula Township, Emil Township

Ethnic Townships
Ashili Daur Township

Other
Qiaheji Ranch, Bozidake Farm, Woyijiayilao Ranch, Tacheng Prefecture Cattle Ranch, Ye'ergaiti XPCC 162 Corp, Akeqiaoke XPCC 163 Corp, Wulasitai XPCC 164 Corp

Climate
Tacheng has a typical Xinjiang cool semi-arid climate (Köppen BSk) that is almost moist enough to be a hot summer humid continental climate (Köppen Dfa), as being on the west side of the Altay Mountains the region receives more winter snowfall than most of Xinjiang.

Transportation
The Karamay–Tacheng Railway (opened on May 30, 2019) connects Tacheng with Baikouquan Station on the Kuytun–Beitun Railway in Karamay City. It takes 9 hours from Tacheng to Ürümqi.

Tacheng is also served by the Tacheng Airport with flights to Ürümqi and other cities in Xinjiang.

References

 Khālidī, Qurbanʻali, Allen J. Frank, and Mirkasym Abdulakhatovich Usmanov. An Islamic Biographical Dictionary of the Eastern Kazakh Steppe, 1770-1912. Brill's Inner Asian library, v. 12. Leiden: Brill, 2004.
 Light, Nathan. "Qazaqs in the People's Republic of China: The Local Processes of History". Bloomington, Indiana: Indiana Center on Global Change and World Peace, Occasional Paper No. 22, June 1994. .
 Light, Nathan. "Kazakhs of the Tarbaghatai: Ethno-History Through a Novel". The Turkish Studies Association Bulletin, 17/2 (1993): 91–102.
 Saguchi Toru. "Kazak Pastoralists on the Tarbaghatai Frontier under the Ch'ing." In: Proceedings of the International Conference on China Border Area Studies. Lin En-hsien [Lin Enxian], ed. Taipei: National Chengchi University, 1985, pp. 953–996.
 Wiens, Herold J. "Change in the Ethnography and Land Use of the Ili Valley and Region, Chinese Turkestan". Annals of the Association of American Geographers, Vol. 59, No. 4. (Dec., 1969), pp. 753–775.

External links

 Map of the City of Tacheng 
Webpage on the Bakktu border crossing in Xinjiang's Land Ports and Border Trade website

Populated places in Xinjiang
China–Kazakhstan border crossings
Tacheng Prefecture
County-level divisions of Xinjiang